Mikhail Vasilyevich Menshikov (born January 17, 1948) is a Russian-British mathematician with publications in areas ranging from probability to combinatorics. He currently holds the post of Professor in the University of Durham.

Menshikov has made a substantial contribution to percolation theory and the theory of random walks.

Menshikov was born in Moscow and went to school in Kharkov, Ukrainian SSR, Soviet Union. He studied at Moscow State University earning all his degrees up to Candidate of Sciences (1976) and Doctor of Sciences (1988). After briefly working in Zhukovsky, Menshikov worked in Moscow State University for many years. His career then took him to the University of Sao Paulo before becoming a professor at the University of Durham, where he currently lives.

External links
Personal webpage

20th-century British mathematicians
21st-century British mathematicians
Russian mathematicians
Probability theorists
1948 births
Living people
Soviet mathematicians
Academics of Durham University